John T. Mills (November 12, 1817 – November 30, 1871) was an American lawyer who served as a Supreme Court Justice for the Republic of Texas.

Biography

Born in County Antrim, Northern Ireland, Mills immigrated to America with his parents as a child. His family settled in Beaufort County, South Carolina, where he studied law before moving to Clarksville, Republic of Texas, in 1837. From 1839 to 1845 he served three consecutive terms as an associate justice of the Supreme Court in the Third, Seventh, and Eighth Judicial Districts. After Texas was admitted to the Union, he served as a judge for the state in various district courts from 1846 to 1850. In 1849, he ran on the Democratic ticket for Governor, but was not elected.

Mills' first marriage, to Mary Jane Vining, lasted from 1843 until her death in 1854; he married a Mrs. Adair and moved to Marshall shortly thereafter. His second marriage produced a son. John Mills died in Marshall, Texas, and is buried in the Marshall Cemetery there. Mills County, Texas, was named in his honor.

References

1817 births
1871 deaths
People from Marshall, Texas
Justices of the Texas Supreme Court
People from County Antrim
Irish emigrants to the United States (before 1923)
Texas Democrats
U.S. state supreme court judges admitted to the practice of law by reading law
19th-century American judges